YTV or ytv may refer to:

 YTV (Canadian TV channel), a Canadian youth television station owned by Corus Entertainment
 YTV (Burmese TV network), a Burmese television channel owned by MY Multimedia Co.,ltd
 Helsinki Metropolitan Area Council, a co-operation agency operating in the Helsinki Metropolitan Area
 Yale TV, the broadcast desk of the student newspaper Yale Daily News
 Yomiuri Telecasting Corporation, a TV station joining Nippon News Network and Nippon Television Network System in Osaka, Japan
 Yorkshire Television, former name of ITV Yorkshire, United Kingdom
 Yumurcak TV, a Turkish channel

See also 
 KYTV (TV station), an NBC affiliated television station in Springfield, Missouri
 WYTV, an ABC affiliated television station in Youngstown, Ohio
 WHYY-TV, a PBS member station in Philadelphia, Pennsylvania